Pharyngeal pouch can refer to:
 Zenker's diverticulum
 Pharyngeal pouch (embryology)